The 2017 FIBA Under-19 Women's Basketball World Cup was hosted by Italy from 22 to 30 July 2017.

Russia won their first title (or third if the Soviet Union is included) by defeating the United States 86–82 in the final. The bronze medal went to Canada who defeated Japan 67–60.

Venues

Qualified teams

* Brazil qualified for the tournament but was suspended by FIBA. A fourth team from FIBA Americas had to be named to take Brazil's place. The draw took place with the fourth FIBA Americas team's identity yet to be named. On 12 May 2017, Mexico was chosen to replace Brazil.

Squads

Preliminary round
The draw for the tournament was held on 1 February 2017 in Udine, Italy.

All times are local (UTC+2).

Group A

Group B

Group C

Group D

Knockout stage

Bracket

5–8th place bracket

9–16th place bracket

13–16th place bracket

Round of 16

9–16th place quarterfinals

Quarterfinals

13–16th place semifinals

9–12th place semifinals

5–8th place semifinals

Semifinals

15th place game

13th place game

Eleventh place game

Ninth place game

Seventh place game

Fifth place game

Bronze medal match

Final

Final standings

Statistics and awards

Statistical leaders

Points

Rebounds

Assists

Blocks

Steals

Awards
 

All-Tournament Team
  Tyasha Harris
  Chennedy Carter
  Raisa Musina
  Laeticia Amihere
  Maria Vadeeva

References

External links
Official website

2017
2017–18 in Italian basketball
2017 in women's basketball
International women's basketball competitions hosted by Italy
Sport in Udine
2017 in youth sport
July 2017 sports events in Europe